The Nordic Asa-Community (Swedish: Nordiska Asa-samfundet; abbreviated NAS) is a Heathen religious organisation founded in Sweden in 2014.

History
The Nordic Asa-Community (NAS) was founded in Sweden in 2014. It was officially recognised and registered by the government of Sweden in February 2016. Since then its membership has increased rapidly, growing from 60 members to 550 in November 2016, making it the largest Heathen organisation in the country. As of June 2018, it had 1100 registered members.

The community has the aims to make asatro an official religion, gathering all Heathens in one body and re-embedding uprooted Swedes into their native historic-cultural tradition. It asserts independence from political parties and ideologies, and forbids all political symbols at its activities, but members can have any political engagements outside the organisation. This distinguishes NAS from the older Swedish Forn Sed Assembly, which has put effort into making political statements against xenophobia.

References

External links
 Official Swedish website
 Official English website

2014 establishments in Sweden
Modern pagan organizations based in Sweden
Germanic neopagan organisations
Religious organizations established in 2014
Modern pagan organizations established in the 2010s